Cardew may refer to:

People with the given name Cardew:

 Alfred Cardew Dixon (1865–1936), English mathematician
 Cardew Robinson (1917–1992), British comic

People with the surname Cardew:

 Cornelius Cardew (1936–1981), English avant-garde composer
 Gail Cardew, British science communicator
 Michael Cardew (1901–1983), English studio potter and ceramic stylist
 Philip Cardew (1851–1910), English army officer and electrical engineer
 Seth Cardew (1934–2016), English studio potter

Places:
 Cardew, Cumbria

English masculine given names